Hiya is a 2016 South Korean film starring Ahn Bo-hyun and Hoya. A directorial debut by Kim Ji-yeon, the film depicts the brotherhood between an elder brother who is a troublemaker and his younger brother, a would-be singer who rejects his brother.

'Hiya' means an elder brother in the Gyeongsang Province dialect.

Cast
 Ahn Bo-hyun as Lee Jin-sang
 Hoya as Lee Jin-ho
 Kang Sung-mi as Lee Hye-jin
 Park Chul-min as Choi Dong-pal
 Kang Min-ah as  Choi Han-joo
 Choi Dae-chul as Gong Chang-bong
 Jung Kyung-ho as Park Dong-suk
 Jo Jae-ryong as Producer Oh
 Choi Phillip assam-is-coel
 Gi Ju-bong
 Jang Do-yoon as Ho-won
 Kim Ho-chang
 Choi Kwon-soo
 Choi Jong-hoon
 Seo Hyeon-woo as Yong-man

References

External links 

2016 films
2010s Korean-language films
South Korean drama films
Films about brothers
2016 drama films
2010s South Korean films